1942–43 Yorkshire Cup

The  Yorkshire Cup competition was a knock-out competition between (mainly professional) rugby league clubs from the county of Yorkshire. The actual area was at times increased to encompass other teams from outside the county such as Newcastle, Mansfield, Coventry, and even London (in the form of Acton & Willesden. The competition always took place early in the season, in the Autumn, with the final taking place in (or just before) December (The only exception to this was when disruption of the fixture list was caused during, and immediately after, the two World Wars)

The Second World War was continuing and the  Yorkshire Cup was played in the early part of the  1942–43 Northern Rugby Football League Wartime Emergency League season

1942–43 was the thirty-fifth occasion on which the  Yorkshire Cup competition had been held.

Dewsbury won the trophy by beating Huddersfield over two legs by an aggregate score of 7–2

Dewsbury played the first leg match at home (at Crown Flatt) and won 7–0. The attendance was 11,000 and receipts were £680.

Huddersfield were at home (at Fartown) for the second leg match and duly won 2-0. The attendance at the second leg match was 6,252 and receipts £618.

Change in Club participation

Hull Kingston Rovers – The club dropped out of the wartime Lancashire league after the ‘first (1939–40) season. They did not return to league competition until 1945–46 peacetime season.

Bramley withdrew after the  third wartime season (1941–42) had finished and did not rejoin until the 1945–46 season.

Castleford withdrew after the  third wartime season (1941–42) had finished and did not participate for two seasons, re-joining for the 1944–45 season.

Hunslet withdrew after the  third wartime season (1941–42) had finished and did not participate for this season, re-joining for the next 1943–44 season.

Wigan – This club entered the  Yorkshire Cup competition for the third successive season

Oldham – The  club, as Wigan, also entered the  Yorkshire Cup competition and for the third successive season

St. Helens – The  club, as Wigan and Oldham}, also entered the Yorkshire Cup competition and for their first season

Dewsbury  had a relatively successful time during the war years. Managed by Eddie Waring, and with the side boosted by the inclusion of a number of big-name guest players, the club won the Wartime Emergency League in 1941–42 and again the following season 1942–43  (though that championship was declared null and void when it was discovered they had played an ineligible player). They were also runners-up in the Championship in 1943–44, Challenge Cup winners in 1943 and Yorkshire Cup final appearances in this season 1940–41 and winners in 1942–43.

Background 

This season there were no junior/amateur clubs taking part, Bramley, Castleford and Hunslet withdrew, and St. Helens joined, which with the continued presence of the two Lancashire clubs, Wigan and Oldham resulted in the number of entrants decreasing by two to a total of fourteen.

This in turn resulted in two byes in the first round.

For the second successive year, ALL the ties (this season including the actual final) were played on a two-legged home and away basis.

Competition and results

Round 1 - First Leg 
Involved  6 matches (with two byes) and 14 clubs

All first round ties are played on a two-legged home and away basis

Round 1 - Second Leg  
Involved  6 matches (with two byes) and 14 clubs

All first round ties are played on a two-legged home and away basis

Round 2 – quarterfinals - First Leg 
Involved 4 matches and 8 clubs

All second round ties are played on a two-legged home and away basis

Round 2 - Second Leg  
Involved 4 matches and 8 clubs

All second round ties are played on a two-legged home and away basis

Round 3 – semifinals - First Leg  
Involved 2 matches and 4 clubs

Both semi-final ties are played on a two-legged home and away basis

Semifinal - Second Leg  
Involved 2 matches and 4 clubs

Both semi-final ties are played on a two-legged home and away basis

Final - First Leg 
The  final was played on a two-legged home and away basis this season

Final - Second Leg  
The  final was played on a two-legged home and away basis this season

Teams and scorers 

Scoring - Try = three (3) points - Goal = two (2) points - Drop goal = two (2) points

The road to success 
All the ties (including the final itself) were played on a two-leg (home and away) basis.

The first club named in each of the ties played the first leg at home.

The scores shown are the aggregate score over the two legs.

Notes and comments 
1 * The  first Yorkshire Cup match to be played by St. Helens and also the first to be played at Knowsley Road

2 * After Extra Time - 80 Mins Score was 19–6 (27-27 Agg)  Wigan win on Aggregate 40–32

See also 
1942–43 Northern Rugby Football League Wartime Emergency League season
Rugby league county cups

References

External links
Saints Heritage Society
1896–97 Northern Rugby Football Union season at wigan.rlfans.com
Hull&Proud Fixtures & Results 1896/1897
Widnes Vikings - One team, one passion Season In Review - 1896-97
The Northern Union at warringtonwolves.org

1942 in English rugby league
RFL Yorkshire Cup